Top Chef: Las Vegas is the sixth season of the American reality television series Top Chef. It was first filmed in Las Vegas, Nevada, before concluding in Napa, California. The season premiered on August 19, 2009, and ended on December 16, 2009. In the season finale, Michael Voltaggio was declared the winner over runners-up Bryan Voltaggio and Kevin Gillespie. Gillespie was voted Fan Favorite. In 2010, Top Chef: Las Vegas received the Primetime Emmy Award for "Outstanding Reality Competition Program".

Contestants
Seventeen chefs were selected to compete in Top Chef: Las Vegas.

Jennifer Carroll and Mike Isabella returned to compete in Top Chef: All-Stars. Bryan Voltaggio competed in the fifth season of Top Chef Masters. Carroll, Isabella, and Kevin Gillespie later competed in Top Chef Duels. Carroll returned again for Top Chef: Colorado, competing in the Last Chance Kitchen. Carroll, Gillespie, and Bryan Voltaggio returned for Top Chef: All-Stars L.A.

Contestant progress

: The chef(s) did not receive immunity for winning the Quickfire Challenge.
: As a reward for winning the Quickfire Challenge, Kevin was allowed to sit out the Elimination Challenge.
: Jesse was eliminated by placing last in the Quickfire Challenge.
: As a reward for winning the Quickfire Challenge, Kevin was given the choice to receive either immunity or $15,000 as his prize. Kevin opted for the money, forfeiting his immunity.
 (WINNER) The chef won the season and was crowned "Top Chef".
 (RUNNER-UP) The chef was a runner-up for the season.
 (WIN) The chef won the Elimination Challenge.
 (HIGH) The chef was selected as one of the top entries in the Elimination Challenge, but did not win.
 (IN) The chef was not selected as one of the top or bottom entries in the Elimination Challenge and was safe.
 (LOW) The chef was selected as one of the bottom entries in the Elimination Challenge, but was not eliminated.
 (OUT) The chef lost the Elimination Challenge.

Episodes

References
Notes

Footnotes

External links
 Official website

Top Chef
2009 American television seasons
Television shows set in the Las Vegas Valley
Television shows shot in the Las Vegas Valley
Television shows filmed in California